Wu Jingbiao (born January 10, 1989, Changle) is a Chinese weightlifter. He won the silver medal at the London 2012 Olympics in the category of weightlifting. After winning the silver medal, he apologized for "shaming the motherland" by not winning a gold medal.

See also
 China at the 2012 Summer Olympics

References

External links
the-sports.org

1989 births
Living people
Chinese male weightlifters
Asian Games medalists in weightlifting
Olympic weightlifters of China
Weightlifters at the 2012 Summer Olympics
Olympic silver medalists for China
Olympic medalists in weightlifting
Weightlifters from Fujian
People from Nanping
Weightlifters at the 2010 Asian Games
Medalists at the 2012 Summer Olympics
Weightlifters at the 2014 Asian Games
World Weightlifting Championships medalists
Asian Games gold medalists for China
Asian Games bronze medalists for China

Medalists at the 2010 Asian Games
Medalists at the 2014 Asian Games
21st-century Chinese people